May December is an upcoming American romantic drama film directed by Todd Haynes and starring Natalie Portman and Julianne Moore.

Plot
Twenty years after their notorious tabloid romance gripped the nation, a married couple with a large age disparity buckles under the pressure when an actress arrives to do research for a film about their past.

Cast
 Natalie Portman as Elizabeth Berry
 Julianne Moore as Gracie Atherton-Yoo
 Charles Melton as Joe Yoo
 Piper Curda as Honor Atherton-Yoo
 Elizabeth Yu as Mary Atherton-Yoo
 Gabriel Chung as Charlie Atherton-Yoo

Production
In June 2021, it was announced that Portman and Moore were cast in the film.  In September 2022, it was announced that Melton was added to the cast.

Production took place in Savannah, Georgia.  Filming wrapped in November 2022.  Ed Lachman was initially going to serve as cinematographer but was replaced by Christopher Blauvelt due to Lachman's hip injury.

In January 2023, it was announced Piper Curda, Elizabeth Yu and Gabriel Chung had joined the cast of the film.

References

External links
 

Upcoming films
Films directed by Todd Haynes
Films produced by Christine Vachon
Killer Films films
Films shot in Savannah, Georgia
Films produced by Will Ferrell
Gloria Sanchez Productions films
Films produced by Natalie Portman